Palau Public Library is the public library of Palau, located in Koror City, Koror.

References

External links
 Palau Public Library

Education in Palau
Educational organizations based in Palau
Buildings and structures in Koror
Libraries in Palau